Body and Soul is an album by the jazz tenor saxophonist Coleman Hawkins, including recordings made between 1939 and 1956. It takes its name from one of Hawkins' most famous performances – a 1939 recording of "Body and Soul". The album also contains a 1956 recording of the same piece. (Because the 1939 recording is held in the highest regard, there have been a number of compilations with the same title, including an earlier CD from Records, on the Topaz Jazz Records/Pearl imprint, and a boxed set from Proper.)

Track listing
"Meet Doctor Foo" (Hawkins) – 2:32
"Fine Dinner" (Hawkins) – 2:33
"She's Funny That Way" (Whiting–Daniels) – 3:14
"Body and Soul" (Heyman–Green–Sour) – 3:00
"When Day Is Done" (Katscher–deSylva) – 3:15
"The Sheik of Araby" (Wheeler–Smith–Snyder) – 2:56
"My Blue Heaven" (Whiting–Donaldson) – 2:46
"Bouncing with Bean" (Hawkins) – 3:03
"Say It Isn't So" (Berlin) – 2:57
"Spotlite" (Hawkins) – 3:06
"April in Paris" (Harburg–Duke) – 3:06
"How Strange" (Prozorovsky–Brent–Kahn–Stothart) – 3:02
"Half Step Down, Please" (Dameron–Hawkins) – 3:02
"Angel Face" (Jones) – 3:12
"There Will Never Be Another You" (Warren–Gordon) – 2:57
"The Bean Stalks Again" (Hawkins) – 3:24
"Body and Soul" – 4:51
"I Love Paris" (Porter) – 3:30
"Under Paris Skies" (Gannon–Drejac–Giraud) – 2:45

Personnel
 Coleman Hawkins – Tenor saxophone
 Tommy Lindsay – Trumpet
 Joe Guy – Trumpet
 Early Hardy – Trombone
  Jackie Fields – Alto saxophone
  Eustis Moore – Alto saxophone
  Gene Rodgers – Piano
  William Oscar Smith – Double Bass
  Arthur Herbert – Drums
  Thelma Carpenter – Vocals on "She's Funny That Way"

References

Coleman Hawkins albums
RCA Records compilation albums
1996 compilation albums